Hibbertia woronorana is a species of flowering plant in the family Dilleniaceae and is endemic to a restricted area of New South Wales. It is a shrub with glabrous foliage, linear leaves with the edges curved downwards, and yellow flowers with five or six stamens joined at the base on one side of two softly-hairy carpels.

Description
Flowering occurs from September to December.

Taxonomy
Hibbertia woronorana was first formally described in 2012 by Hellmut R. Toelken in the Journal of the Adelaide Botanic Gardens from specimens collected by Ruurd Dirk Hoogland near the Woronora River. The specific epithet (woronorana) refers to the Woronora River, near where this species mainly occurs.

Distribution and habitat
This hibbertia grows on rocky sandstone slopes along the mid and lower reaches of the Woronora River in New South Wales.

See also
List of Hibbertia species

References

woronorana
Flora of New South Wales
Plants described in 2012
Taxa named by Hellmut R. Toelken